In probability theory and statistics, coskewness is a measure of how much three random variables change together. Coskewness is the third standardized cross central moment, related to skewness as covariance is related to variance. In 1976, Krauss and Litzenberger used it to examine risk in stock market investments. The application to risk was extended by Harvey and Siddique in 2000.

If three random variables exhibit positive coskewness they will tend to undergo extreme deviations at the same time, an odd number of which are in the positive direction (so all three random variables undergoing extreme positive deviations, or one undergoing an extreme positive deviation while the other two undergo extreme negative deviations). Similarly, if three random variables exhibit negative coskewness they will tend to undergo extreme deviations at the same time, an even number of which are in the positive direction (so all three random variables undergoing extreme negative deviations, or one undergoing an extreme negative deviation while the other two undergo extreme positive deviations).

Definition 
For three random variables X, Y and Z, the non-trivial coskewness statistic is defined as:
 

 

Properties 
Skewness is a special case of the coskewness when the three random variables are identical:
 

For two random variables, X and Y, the skewness of the sum, X + Y, is

 

The coskewness between variables X and Y does not depend on the scale on which the variables are expressed. If we are analyzing the relationship between X and Y, the coskewness between X and Y will be the same as the coskewness between a + bX and c + dY, where a, b, c, and d are constants.

Example

Let X be standard normally distributed and Y be the distribution obtained by setting X=Y whenever X<0 and drawing Y independently from a standard half-normal distribution whenever X>0.  In other words, X and Y are both standard normally distributed with the property that they are completely correlated for negative values and uncorrelated apart from sign for positive values.  The joint probability density function is

where H(x) is the Heaviside step function and δ(x) is the Dirac delta function.  The third moments are easily calculated by integrating with respect to this density:

Note that although X and Y are individually standard normally distributed, the distribution of the sum X+Y is significantly skewed.  From integration with respect to density, we find that the covariance of X and Y is

from which it follows that the standard deviation of their sum is

Using the skewness sum formula above, we have

This can also be computed directly from the probability density function of the sum:

See also 
 Moment (mathematics)
 Cokurtosis

References

Further reading 
 
 

Algebra of random variables
Theory of probability distributions
Covariance and correlation